Water Natuurlijk ( or 'Water Of Course') is a political party in the Netherlands that focuses exclusively on water board politics. The party received the highest number of votes in the 2008, 2015 and 2019 water board elections.

History 
Water Natuurlijk was founded in 2008 by a number of environmental and recreational organizations. The party aims to improve water quality to ensure the well-being and safety of humans, animals and plants. The party is endorsed by Democrats 66 and GroenLinks, who refrain from participating in water board elections.

Election results

Water board elections

See also 
 General Water Board Party

References

External links 
 Official website

Political parties in the Netherlands
Political parties established in 2008
2008 establishments in the Netherlands
Environmental organisations based in the Netherlands
Green political parties in the Netherlands